Scissurella clathrata is a species of minute sea snail, a marine gastropod mollusk or micromollusk in the family Scissurellidae, the little slit snails.

Description
The shell grows to a height of 1.7 mm.

Distribution 
This marine species occurs off Argentina, the Falkland Islands, Tierra del Fuego, Chile

References

External links
 To Antarctic Invertebrates
 To Biodiversity Heritage Library (2 publications)
 To Encyclopedia of Life
 To USNM Invertebrate Zoology Mollusca Collection
 To World Register of Marine Species

Scissurellidae
Gastropods described in 1908